Raúl Esteban Sánchez Lamothe (born 30 April 1977) is an Argentine actor.

Biography 
Esteban Lamothe was born on April 30, 1977, in Florentino Ameghino, Buenos Aires, Argentina. At 17, in 1994, he moved to Federal Capital. He worked until age 30 as a waiter, until he got roles in films and television strips.

Career 
In 2011, with the film The Student
he got his work more visibility. As of 2012, it acquires greater popularity by participating in fictions such as Sos mi hombre and Farsantes, both transmitted by Canal 13. His first protagonist was in Guapas, series transmitted by Canal 13. In 2015, along with María Eugenia Suárez, he starred in the film Abzurdah in the role of Alejo. In 2016, he stars in Educando a Nina, daily fiction of Underground Productions broadcast on Telefe. In that same year he also plays the main character in the series Estocolmo. In 2017, he plays the character of Javier "Javo" Valdés, in the series Las Estrellas (telenovela), beside Celeste Cid, Marcela Kloosterboer, Violeta Urtizberea, Natalie Pérez, Justina Bustos, Gonzalo Valenzuela, Luciano Castro and Rafael Ferro, among others. He obtained the Martín Fierro as the Leading Actor of Daily Fiction. In 2018 he is the protagonist of the second part of El marginal, instead of Juan Minujín. In 2019 he stars in the series Campanas en la noche together with Federico Amador and Calu Rivero, he plays the villain Vito Paternó.

Personal life 
He was in a relationship from 2007 with actress Julieta Zylberberg. On December 8, 2012, they became parents of a boy named Luis Ernesto Lamothe. On May 31, 2017, Lamothe confirmed his separation.

Filmography

Movies

Television

Video clips

Awards and nominations

References

External links 

1977 births
Living people
Argentine male film actors
Argentine male television actors